This list of museums in County Durham, England, contains museums which are defined for this context as institutions (including nonprofit organizations, government entities, and private businesses) that collect and care for objects of cultural, artistic, scientific, or historical interest and make their collections or related exhibits available for public viewing. Also included are non-profit art galleries and university art galleries.  Museums that exist only in cyberspace (i.e., virtual museums) are not included.

Defunct museums
Durham Miners Heritage Centre
Vintage Vehicles Shildon, closed in 2012

References

Visit Britain: Museums and Galleries in County Durham
This is Durham

See also
 Visitor attractions in County Durham

 
Durham
Museums